Enoch Zundel ben Joseph (חנוך זונדל בן יוסף; died 1867) was a Russian Talmudist best known as author of a commentary on Ein Yaakov and Midrash Rabbah. He spent his life in Białystok, Poland; he was a maggid there and gave shiurim on Midrash.

He is author of the following works:
 A threefold commentary on Midrash Rabbah of the Pentateuch and five Megillot, in two parts (Wilna and Grodno, 1829–34; 2d ed., Wilna, 1845). It is composed of Etz Yosef ("Tree of Joseph"), which explains it according to the simple explanation of its meaning; Anaf Yosef ("Branch of Joseph"), which explains it homiletically; and Yad Yosef, which cross-references it to other midrashim. He writes in his introduction to the work that he named the work after his father. His commentary received approbations from numerous rabbis, among them Rabbi Yaakov Tzvi Mecklenburg, author of HaKetav VeHaKabbalah.
 A twofold commentary on Midrash Tanchuma (ib. 1833)
 A threefold commentary on Seder 'Olam (ib. 1845)
 Commentary on Midrash Samuel (Stettin, 1860)
 Mibḥar Mi-Peninim, a commentary on the Midrash Rabbah of the Pentateuch (Warsaw, 1870)
 Novellæ on the Haggadah of the Talmud (Wilna, 1883)—these commentaries are, in fact, compilations from other commentaries, especially those of Samuel Jafe Ashkenazi, Hellin, and Bärman Ashkenazi, to which Enoch added novellæ of his own
 Olat ha-Ḥodesh, prayers for the new moon, with treatises on fast-days, philanthropy, etc. (ib. 1859)
 A commentary on Pesikta Rabbati
 Hoi Ariel, a funeral sermon on the death of R. Löb Katzenellenbogen of Brest (ib. 1838), a reference to Isaiah 29:1
 Avel Kaved, a eulogy for Rabbi Yitzchak Isaac Tiktin
 A Twofold commentary on the siddur [Jewish Prayer Book]

Jewish Encyclopedia bibliography
Fürst, Bibl. Jud. ii. 107-108, iii. 396;
Fuenn, Keneset Yisrael, p. 312;
Eliezer Kohn, Ḳin'at Soferim, p. 107.

References

1867 deaths
Russian rabbis
People from Białystok
Year of birth unknown